Lars Nesheim Vaular (born September 20, 1984) is a rapper and songwriter from Åsane, Bergen, Norway. He started rapping in 2003. He initially released songs under the duo Tier'n og Lars before going solo.

Tier'n & Lars
Vaular had his beginnings as a hip hop duo formation with Fernando Manuel called Tier'n & Lars or alternatively Tier'n og Lars. The two hip hop artists with Manuel known as Tier'n cooperated with the Norwegian hip hop crew Freakshow with some tracks in a mixtape called We Are the Champions in 2004, followed the same year with Freakshow Presents Tier'n og Lars – Frykt og Avsky i Bergen. The limited edition was a promotional mixtape by the label Freakshow Mixtapes in Norway. The mixtape had cooperation from many artists including Tungtvann, Side Brok, Kleen Cut and F'EM.

In 2005, Tier'n og Lars released a street album Tilbake til stripa: Forberedelsen, available for free download with guest tracks by Even Brenna, Anand, Leeroy, DJ Leven, I. Forgot, Harry West and Nja'al, firmly establishing them as popular hip hop acts culminating in an album Kulturclash released on 23 October 2006.

Solo career
Vaular debuted as a solo artist in 2007 with the album La Hat - Et nytt dagslys... followed by D'e glede in 2009 and  Helt om natten, helt om dagen in 2010 as a major national release that reached top 3 on VG-lista, the official Norwegian Albums chart. He was nominated in 2009 for a Spellemannprisen (the Norwegian equivalent of the Grammys) in the hip hop category for his album D'e glede. His album Du betyr meg in 2011 reached Top 5. His new release is Flere steder alltid.

Vaular has worked with various artists like Tungtvann, Side Brok, Jan Eggum, Myra, Fjorden Baby!, Röyksopp and John Olav Nilsen & Gjengen.

Personal life
Lars Vaular was criticized for the controversial track "Kem skjøt Siv Jensen" ("Who Shot Siv Jensen") about the Norwegian politician Siv Jensen, leader of the populist Progress Party. This "violence" label has followed him in many comments in social media, although he claims the song was about how people easily fooled by headlines they read.

Lars Vaular is the cousin of Sondre Lerche.

Discography

Collaborations with Freakshow
2003: Come on b/w Hva skjer (12" vinyl) 
2004: We are the champions Mixtape

As Tier'n & Lars
2004: Freakshow Presents Tier'n Og Lars – Frykt og avsky i Bergen Mixtape (mixtape)
2005: Tilbake til stripa: Forberedelsen (street album) 
2006: Kulturclash'' (album)

Solo albums

Solo EPs

Singles

References

External links 

 Official site
 Lars Vaular's blog
 Lars Vaular's MySpace
 Lars Vaular's Twitter

People educated at the Bergen Cathedral School
21st-century Norwegian singers
Norwegian-language singers
Musicians from Bergen
1984 births
Living people